Kushneria is a genus from the family of Halomonadaceae.

References

Oceanospirillales
Bacteria genera
Taxa described in 2009